The 2006 Sultan Qaboos Cup was the 34th edition of the Sultan Qaboos Cup, the premier knockout tournament for football teams in Oman.

The competition began on 19 August 2006 with the Group Stage and concluded on 20 November 2006. Al-Nasr S.C.S.C. were the defending champions, having won their fourth title in 2005. On Monday 20 November 2006, Dhofar S.C.S.C. were crowned the champions of the 2006 Sultan Qaboos Cup when they defeated Sur SC 2-1, hence winning the title for the seventh time.

Teams
This year the tournament had 31 teams. The winners qualified for the 2007 AFC Cup.
 Ahli Sidab Club (Sidab)
 Al-Hamra SC (Al-Hamra)
 Al-Ittihad Club (Salalah)
 Al-Kamel Wa Al-Wafi SC 
 Al-Khaboora SC (Al-Khaboora)
 Al-Mudhaibi SC (Al-Mudhaibi)
 Al-Musannah SC (Al-Musannah)
 Al-Nahda Club (Al-Buraimi)
 Al-Nasr S.C.S.C. (Salalah)
 Al-Oruba SC (Sur)
 Al-Rustaq SC (Rustaq)
 Al-Salam SC (Sohar)
 Al-Seeb Club (Seeb)
 Al-Shabab Club (Seeb)
 Al-Suwaiq Club (Suwaiq
 Al-Tali'aa SC (Sur)
 Al-Wahda SC (Sur)
 Bahla Club (Bahla)
 Bowsher Club (Bawshar)
 Dhofar S.C.S.C. (Salalah)
 Fanja SC (Fanja)
 Ja'lan SC (Jalan Bani Bu Ali)
 Khasab SC (Khasab)
 Majees SC (Majees)
 Mirbat SC (Mirbat)
 Muscat Club (Muscat)
 Nizwa Club (Nizwa)
 Oman Club (Muscat)
 Quriyat Club (Quriyat)
 Saham SC (Saham)
 Samail SC (Samail)
 Salalah SC (Salalah)
 Sohar SC (Sohar)
 Sur SC (Sur)

Group stage

Group A

Group B

Group C

Group D

Group E

Group F

Group G

Group H

Group Stage Results
The first match played was between Al-Nasr S.C.S.C. and Khasab SC on 19 August 2006. 16 teams advanced to the Round of 16.

Round of 16
16 teams played a knockout tie. 8 ties were played over one leg. The first match was played between Oman Club and Sur SC on 21 September 2006. 8 teams advanced to the quarterfinals.

Quarterfinals
8 teams played a knockout tie. 4 ties were played over two legs. The first match was played between Sur SC and Al-Nahda Club on 28 September 2006. Sur SC, Al-Seeb Club, Dhofar S.C.S.C. and Bahla Club qualified for the semifinals.

1st Legs

2nd Legs

Semifinals
4 teams played a knockout tie. 2 ties were played over two legs. The first match was played between Sur SC and Al-Seeb Club on 16 October 2006. Sur SC and Dhofar S.C.S.C. qualified for the Finals.

1st Legs

2nd Legs

Third Place

Finals

References

External links
Oman Sultan Cup 2006-2007 at Goalzz.com

Sultan Qaboos Cup seasons
Cup